Flavius Lucius (floruit 408–413) was a politician of the Roman Empire.

In 408, he was comes sacrarum largitionum at the Eastern court. In 413, he was Roman consul together with Heraclianus, but his name is recorded only on Eastern inscriptions.

Notes

Sources 
 Jones, Arnold Hugh Martin, John Robert Martindale, John Morris, "Fl. Lucius 3", Prosopography of the Later Roman Empire, Volume 2, Cambridge University Press, 1992, p. 692.

5th-century Byzantine people
5th-century Roman consuls
Comites sacrarum largitionum
Imperial Roman consuls